This is a list of notable churches in Belize. Christianity is the dominant religion in Belize. The single largest denomination is the Roman Catholic Church with about 40.1% of the population (129,456 adherents), a reduction from 49.6% of the population in 2000, 57.7% in 1991 and 61.9% in 1980, although absolute numbers have still risen. 
Other major groups include Pentecostal with 8.4% of the population up from 7.4% in 2000 and 6.3% in 1991, Seventh-day Adventists with 5.4% of the population up from 5.2% in 2000 and 4.1% in 1991.

By location

Belize City
 Port Loyola Calvary Chapel 
 St. Andrew's Church (Belize City) 
 Unity Presbyterian Church, Belize City

Belmopan
 Our Lady of Guadalupe Co-Cathedral
 St. Ann's Anglican Church

Georgeville

San Ignacio
 St. Andrew's Anglican Church (San Ignacio)

By type

Cathederals

Roman Catholic churches in Belize

 Sacred Heart Church, Dangriga
 St. Peter Claver Catholic parish, Belize

Roman Catholic churches in Belize City
 Holy Redeemer Cathedral 
 Holy Redeemer Catholic Parish, Belize City 
 St. Martin de Porres Church, Belize City

See also

 Religion in Belize
 Culture of Belize

References

Churches in Belize
B